Klempicz  is a village in the administrative district of Gmina Lubasz, within Czarnków-Trzcianka County, Greater Poland Voivodeship, in west-central Poland. It is a possible location for a planned second Polish nuclear power plant (NPP "Warta-Klempicz").

External links 
 May 2011: Confirmation delayed for nuclear power site

References

Klempicz